Olha Maslivets, Olga Maslivets, (born 23 June 1978 in Ternopil) is a Ukrainian-born Russian windsurfer who has competed at four Olympic Games (2000, 2004, 2008 and 2012).  Her best result came in 2012, when she finished 4th in the women's RS-X event.

References

External links
 

1978 births
Living people
Female windsurfers
Sailors at the 2000 Summer Olympics – Mistral One Design
Sailors at the 2004 Summer Olympics – Mistral One Design
Sailors at the 2008 Summer Olympics – RS:X
Sailors at the 2012 Summer Olympics – RS:X
Olympic sailors of Ukraine
Ukrainian female sailors (sport)
Ukrainian windsurfers
Sportspeople from Ternopil
Naturalised citizens of Russia
Olympic sailors of Russia
Russian female sailors (sport)
Ukrainian emigrants to Russia
Universiade medalists in sailing
Universiade bronze medalists for Ukraine
Medalists at the 2005 Summer Universiade